Wallengrenia egeremet, the northern broken dash , is a butterfly of the family Hesperiidae. It is found in North America from southern Maine and southern Ontario, west across the Great Lakes states to southeastern North Dakota, south to central Florida, the Gulf Coast and south-eastern Texas.

The wingspan is 25–39 mm. Adults are on wing from June to August in one generation in most of the range. There are two generations with adults on wing from May to October in the deep south and eastern Texas.

The larvae feed on various Panicum species, including Panicum clandestinum and Panicum dichotomum. Adults feed on the nectar from various flowers, but they prefer white, pink or purple flowers, including dogbane, red clover, New Jersey tea and sweet pepperbush.

There appears to be some uncertainty in which genus this species belongs to, with NatureServe recognizing it as a member of the genus Polites. Furthermore, it appears some believe this species is a subspecies of Wallengrenia otho.

References

External links
Butterflies and Moths of North America

Hesperiini
Butterflies described in 1863
Butterflies of North America